The Battle of Zinjibar was a battle between forces loyal to Yemeni leader Ali Abdullah Saleh and Islamist militant forces, possibly including elements of al-Qaeda in the Arabian Peninsula (AQAP), for control of the town of Zinjibar and its surroundings as part of the wider insurgency in the self-declared Al-Qaeda Emirate in Yemen. Many of the Islamist forces operating in Abyan province refer to themselves as Ansar al-Sharia ("Partisans of Sharia").

The battle

On 27 May, about 300 Islamic militants attacked and captured the coastal city of Zinjibar (population 20,000). During the takeover of the town, the militants killed seven soldiers, including colonel Qassem Sheikh, and one civilian.

On 28 May, the militants consolidated their control of Zinjibar by capturing six army tanks and several armored vehicles. The military clashed with the alleged Islamist fighters outside the city and shelled the outskirts of the town. By late on 29 May, the militants still had full control of the city. Some opposition figures and activists charged that President Saleh allowed the capture of Zinjibar by the supposed Islamists to support his claims that the country would not be able to survive without him.

On 30 May, the military hit Islamist positions in the city with air strikes while the Army was hitting the outskirts of Zinjibar with artillery.

On 31 May, heavy street fighting and shelling was still going on with the military attempting to enter the city but still being holed up by the militants on Zinjibar's outskirts. At least one militant was killed in the city by the artillery. 15 soldiers were killed during overnight fighting, of which five were killed and 23 others wounded in a suicide car-bombing that targeted a military convoy, two others were killed in a rocket attack near a barracks and six were killed and two mortally wounded in an attack on a military checkpoint around a kilometre from Zinjibar in which the attackers set fire to 10 military vehicles. At least two militants were killed during the fighting on the outskirts. Three civilians were killed during the air-strikes.

On 7 June, the military made another attempt to storm the city. During the fighting, 30 militants, 15 soldiers and two civilians were killed and at least 12 soldiers and four militants were wounded.

On 11 June, the Yemeni Ministry of Defence reported that government troops had killed 18 militants in Zinjibar and three in nearby Lawdar in addition to destroying a weapons and ammunition cache in Zinjibar. The militants in Zinjibar died when they attacked the base of the 25th Mechanised Brigade during which nine soldiers were killed. Militants also killed five government soldiers and destroyed three vehicles in an ambush on a convoy headed to Lawdar. The next day, three government soldiers, including a colonel, were reportedly killed by militants in Zinjibar.

On 19 June, officials reported that the government shelled militants in the Dufas area of Zinjibar, killing 12 and wounding three. In response, Islamic militants released the names and ranks of 12 military officers that they planned to kill in retaliation. The government also had shelled and launched airstrikes against militants hiding out in the area, killing an unknown number. Two government soldiers were also killed in the fighting.

By 20 June, government forces had killed five more fighters as they continued their offensive against Islamist militants in the city, losing five of their own men and suffering 21 wounded in the process. Officials claimed that they were "on the verge of completely cleansing Zinjibar" of militants, though this claim was not independently confirmed.

Despite the military claim of being on the verge of re-taking Zinjibar, the very next day, on 21 June, the 119th and 201st Artillery Brigades were forced to withdraw around three kilometers from positions they previously held in what the Army called a "tactical move".

During the morning, on 29 June, the Yemeni air force conducted air-strikes against militant positions in Zinjibar killing 10 militant fighters. During the bombing raids, one strike hit a civilian bus on the road to Aden. Five civilians on the bus were killed and 12 were wounded. Later during the day, militants attacked a stadium near Zinjibar, from where the military was conducting attacks against militant positions. 26 soldiers and 17 militants were killed in the fighting and the militants eventually took control of the stadium. This left a nearby military base, which was used as a main staging ground for military raids against Zinjibar, totally exposed on the eastern side. Because of this, the military quickly organised a counter-attack to take back the stadium. The counter-attack continued well into the night without any clear result.

The next day, the military claimed they had beaten back the militants and retaken the stadium. At least one more militant was reported to had been killed. The military suffered 35 soldiers dead during two days of fighting for the stadium. Six civilians were also killed during the clashes. However, just two days later, it was confirmed by civilian witnesses that the stadium was still in the hands of the militants. The military also stated that 50 of their soldiers were missing after the stadium takeover.

On 3 July, 15 militants and 10 soldiers were killed during fighting outside the main military base.

On 4 July, the militant attacks on the base continued with 13 more militants and 6 soldiers killed.

On 5 July, the military claimed that 40 militants were killed in massive air-strikes against fighters who were trying to storm the military base. Two soldiers were also reportedly killed in the fighting. However, the claim could not be independently confirmed because most of the area was still under militant control. Four civilians were also killed in one botched air-strike on a house of a top parliamentarian on the outskirts of the city.

On 6 July, one soldier and seven militants were killed in clashes near Zinjibar. Two militants were also captured and arrested in the fighting, in which militants attempted to attack an army base.

On 17 July, government forces and armed tribespeople launched a large offensive against militants in Zinjibar. Responding to pleas for support from the 25th Mechanised Brigade, which had been pinned down under siege for over a month, the Defence Ministry sent extra tanks, rocket launchers, and 500 new soldiers in a renewed effort to reestablish control over the city and the surrounding area. The offensive opened up with a renewed landborne thrust against Islamist positions besieging the 25th Brigade, backed by heavy tank shelling and naval rocket strikes. According to one official, 15 militants were killed and dozens injured in the attack, while the government only lost two soldiers. Local tribespeople sent 450 fighters to support the effort, marking a change in loyalties for the tribes of the region. Many tribes had previously had close ties with the militants, but began supporting government troops in their efforts to dislodge Islamists from Abyan after an estimated 54,000 civilians were forced to flee their homes as militants tried to establish control over Zinjibar and Abyan province. The same day, a military spokesperson stated that four soldiers and 10 militants had been killed in fighting near the base of the 25th Mechanised Brigade. Government troops also destroyed a weapons cache belonging to the militants that had been found near the base.

On 19 July, a government official stated that Hassan Basanbol (alias Abu Issa), a suspected leader of Al-Qaeda in the Arabian Peninsula in the Abyan province, had been killed in combat with government soldiers in Zinjibar on 18 July. Meanwhile, armed tribespeople cleared Islamist militants from the nearby towns of Shuqrah and Wade'a without a shot fired. However, militants remained in control of Lawdar, even after local tribal leaders asked them to leave the town. Zinjibar and the area of Jaʿār to the north also remained under control of local Islamists.

On 21 July, government officials reported the death of another Yemeni AQAP leader, Ayad al-Shabwani, in fighting near Zinjibar on 19 July. The official news agency also reported the death of another AQAP leader, Awad Mohammed Saleh al-Shabwani.

On 22 July, a source affiliated with the local tribes stated that armed tribespeople intercepted a convoy of militants headed to Zinjibar near the town of Mudiyah, killing one militant, wounding another, and arresting ten. Tribespeople had also succeeded in securing the road from Shabwa Governorate to Shuqrah, the source said. In addition, an official from Zinjibar stated that the army had succeeded intaking control of a local sports stadium in ongoing clashes with militants in the city. Two soldiers were killed and four wounded in clashes near the entrance of Zinjibar as government forces continued their efforts to enter the town, bringing the week's death toll for government forces to 10.

On 25 July, 10 militants were killed while attacking a military camp outside of Zinjibar.

On 30 July, 40 pro-government tribal fighters were killed in a friendly-fire incident in which government forces accidentally launched airstrikes on their positions. 28 soldiers had also been killed in heavy fighting during the previous two days, including Brigadier General Ahmad Awad Hassan al-Marmi, the commander of military forces in Abyan province. The next day, a new round of air-strikes killed 15 militants and destroyed a captured army tank and several artillery positions held by the Islamists in the Dufas area near Zinjibar.

On 11 August, local officials reported that four militants had been killed when government artillery struck their positions in the villages of Al-Khamla and Bajdar, located outside of Zinjibar. Fierce clashes also erupted the day before between Islamists and the 25th Mechanised Brigade.

On 16 August, armed tribesmen arrested seven militants, including two Saudi citizens, in the village of Shuqrah, according to the head of security for the Wadhi region. The next day, however, the village was reported by tribal sources to have fallen back into Islamist hands after government forces put up little resistance to a militant convoy advancing from a nearby town.

On 10 September, the Yemeni Army 119th Brigade, which had defected to the opposition, launched a joint operation with 31st and 201st brigades which were still loyal to Saleh. The military claimed to had retook the city from militants, relieving besieged army units in the process. Still, fighting continued in the area around the city and one military official stated that the army only managed capture the northern and eastern parts of the city.

Aftermath
On 13 November, Yemeni army and tribal fighters killed nine suspected AQAP militants in fighting in Zinjibar.

On 14 January, hundreds of people displaced by months of fighting were allowed to return to their homes after a temporary deal was reached between insurgent forces and the army units. Locals described "widespread" destruction across the city and several mine fields that the army warned them about. According to reports, the militants held the western part of the city, while the east was controlled by government forces. Thousands of people previously held protests demanding an end to the fighting that has forced them to flee their homes in the south, holding several 50 km (31 mile) marches from the port city of Aden to Zinjibar. Estimates of the number of people displaced from the government operations against the militants had risen to nearly 97,000.

March 2012 militant offensive

On 4 March, militants launched an attack against an Army artillery battalion on the outskirts of Zinjibar, overrunning it and killing 187 soldiers and wounding 135. 32 Al-Qaeda in the Arabian Peninsula fighters also died during the fighting. The militants attacked the Army base with booby-trapped vehicles and managed to capture armored vehicles, tanks, weapons and munitions. The military reported 55 soldiers were captured while the militant group claimed up to 73 were taken prisoner. Reinforcements from other nearby military bases came too late due to a sandstorm. It was also revealed that previous military claims of taking back the city were untrue, with the militants still controlling most of Zinjibar and a few surrounding towns, namely Jaar where they paraded the captured soldiers. In the days following the attack, the military conducted air-strikes against militant positions around Zinjibar which they claimed killed 42 Al-Qaeda in the Arabian Peninsula fighters.

The Ansar al-Sharia (Yemen) group that took responsibility for the attack is believed to be just a re-branding of Al-Qaeda in the Arabian Peninsula to make it more appealing to the devout rural population. Three days after the attack, the group let a Red Cross team into Jaar to treat 12 wounded soldiers and demanded a prisoner exchange with the government.

May 2012 military offensive

Sporadic fighting in the province continued, finally culminating in a new military offensive in May 2012, with the intent of re-capturing Zinjibar and Jaar. On 12 June the Yemeni army succeeded in retaking Zinjibar and Jaar, pushing the militants away after heavy clashes in and around both towns. The city of Shuqrah fell on June 15, and militants retreated towards neighboring Shabwah Governorate.

2015–2016 fall and recapture

Al-Qaeda's fighters stormed Jaar and  Zinjibar in early December 2015 and recaptured the towns, later declaring them "Emirates", providing civilian services, and establishing a Sharia court.  In summer 2016 Yemeni government forces backed by Arab coalition aircraft and gunboats moved to retake the towns, and despite encountering "repeated suicide attacks" drove AQAP out of Zinjibar on 14 August 2016.

Notes

References

Zinjibar
Zinjibar
2011 in Yemen
Abyan Governorate